The Minster is a river in the Swiss canton of Schwyz and a tributary of the Sihl river. Since the creation of the artificial Sihlsee reservoir by impounding the Sihl, the Minster now flows into the reservoir rather than directly into the river.

The river's headwaters lie near the Ibergeregg pass, on the slopes of the Furggelenstock and Firstspitz mountains. From there it flows in a north-western direction to the villages of Oberiberg and Unteriberg. Between the two villages, the river flows under the Jessenenbruecke bridge.

References

External links
 

Rivers of the canton of Schwyz
Sihl
Rivers of Switzerland